The flag of Denver is the official flag of the City and County of Denver in Colorado. It was designed by a North High School student, Margaret Overbeck, and adopted in 1926. A zigzag white stripe horizontally separates a red field below from a blue field above, in which is centered a yellow circle, together forming a stylized depiction of the Sun in a blue sky above snow-capped mountains.  The color yellow symbolizes gold in the state's hills, and red the colored earth to which the word colorado refers.  The circle's centered position symbolizes Denver's central location within the state. The white zigzag symbolizes Colorado's Native American heritage.

In a 2004 review by the North American Vexillological Association of 150 U.S. city flags, the Denver city flag was ranked third best, behind the flags of Washington, D.C. and Chicago.

In heraldic vexillology, the flag is blazoned Per fess dancetty of two azure and gules a fess dancetty of two argent in chief a bezant.

References

Flag
Flags of cities in Colorado
Flags introduced in 1926
1926 establishments in Colorado